Steroidobacter agariperforans is a Gram-negative, aerobic, non-spore-forming and non-motile bacterium from the genus of Steroidobacter.

References

Bacteria described in 2014
Gammaproteobacteria